Little Miss Fortune is a 1917 American silent comedy drama film directed by Joseph Levering and starring Marian Swayne, Lucile Dorrington and Hugh Thompson.

Cast
 Marian Swayne as Sis
 Lucile Dorrington as Flossie
 Hugh Thompson as Jim
 Bradley Barker as Ned
 Anna Day-Perry

References

Bibliography
 Robert B. Connelly. The Silents: Silent Feature Films, 1910-36, Volume 40, Issue 2. December Press, 1998.

External links
 

1917 films
1917 drama films
1910s English-language films
American silent feature films
American black-and-white films
Films directed by Joseph Levering
1910s American films
Silent American drama films